Sharlett Mena is an American politician who is a member of the Washington House of Representatives for the 29th district. Elected in November 2022, she assumed office on January 9, 2022.

Early life and education 
The daughter of immigrant farmworkers, Mena was raised in Tri-Cities, Washington. She earned a Bachelor of Arts degree in public administration from Washington State University.

Career 
In 2012 and 2013, Mena served as the web communications manager for Congressman Albio Sires. From 2013 to 2016, she was the communications director and scheduler for Congressman Gene Green. Mena worked as the digital director for Governor Jay Inslee's re-election campaign during the 2016 Washington gubernatorial election. Mena later worked as a communications specialist for Democratic members of the Washington State Legislature and served in Inslee's gubernatorial office as deputy director. Since 2019, she has served as special assistant to the director of the Washington State Department of Ecology.

References 

Living people
Democratic Party members of the Washington House of Representatives
People from Tri-Cities, Washington
Washington State University alumni
Year of birth missing (living people)